Solidago leiocarpa, common name Cutler's alpine goldenrod, is a plant species native to mountainous portions of Québec, northern New England, and northern New York State. It is generally found at elevations over 800 m (2400 feet).

Solidago leiocarpa is closely related to the more widespread S. multiradiata, distinguished by the shape of the phyllaries surrounding the flower heads. Solidago leiocarpais a perennial herb up to 35 cm (14 inches) tall. One plant can have as many as 160 small yellow flower heads in a flat-topped or conical array.

References

leiocarpa
Plants described in 1836
Flora of Quebec
Flora of the Northeastern United States
Flora without expected TNC conservation status